Volvo XC is a name prefix/suffix that has been applied to multiple crossovers/SUVs by Volvo. 'XC' is an abbreviation for Cross Country with the X representing 'Cross' and the C abbreviating 'Country'.

Vehicles that have used or are currently using the nameplate are:

Production
 Volvo XC40 (2017–present)
 Volvo XC40 Recharge (2020–present)
 Volvo XC60 (2008–present)
 Volvo XC60 (2008–2017)
 Volvo XC60 (2017–present)
 Volvo V70 XC/XC70 (1998–2003 (V70 XC)), (2003–2016 (XC70))
 Volvo V70 XC (1998–2000)
 Volvo V70 XC (2000–2003)
 Volvo XC70 (2003–2008)
 Volvo XC70 (2008–2016)
 Volvo XC90
 Volvo XC90 (2002–2014)
 Volvo XC Classic (2014–2016)
 Volvo XC90 (2014–present)

Gallery

Concept 
Volvo Concept XC Coupe (2014)
Volvo XC60 (2007)

Gallery

See also 
Volvo Cross Country (disambiguation)

Volvo Cars